The universal 4 x 100 metres relay at the 2018 World Para Athletics European Championships will be held at the Friedrich-Ludwig-Jahnsportpark in Berlin from 20 to 26 August. 1 event will be held over this distance. This is the sole mixed gender event at the Championships (excepting guides in T11 events).

Medalists

See also
List of IPC world records in athletics

References

Universal 4 x 100 metres relay